Kofi Bucknor (1953–2017) was a Ghanaian actor who starred in the films like Heritage Africa (1989),  (1989), and Run Baby Run (2006). He died on 23 May 2017 at the 37 Military Hospital, cause of his death was unknown.

References 

1953 births
2017 deaths
Ghanaian male film actors
20th-century Ghanaian male actors
21st-century Ghanaian male actors